Ernst Gustav Kraatz (13 March 1831 – 2 November 1909) was a German entomologist. He collected and described numerous beetles including Staphylinidae.

Kraatz was born in Berlin on 13 March 1831. He studied law in the University of Heidelberg and at the University of Bonn but found no interest in it and through the influence of Carl August Dohrn he shifted to study entomology at the University of Berlin and later became was a professor. He was mainly interested in Coleoptera. Kraatz worked on the beetle fauna of the whole world using the vast collections in the Natural History Museum of Berlin and described numerous species. Loss of eyesight led to stoppage of work and he died in Berlin. His collection is held by Deutsches Entomologisches Institut.

Works

Kraatz, G. (1856a-1857a) Naturgeschichte der Insecten Deutschlands. Abt. 1. Coleoptera. Zweiter Band. Berlin: Verlag der Nicolaischen Buchhandlung, viii+1080 pp.
Kraatz, G. Prof. Dr. Gustav Kraatz. 50 järingen Jubilaeum 164 pages, 4 plates 1906  gives a complete list the list of his publications and the species described.

References

Further reading
Andreas Wessel, 2007 D.E.Z. – A history. 150 years of scientific publishing in entomology Dtsch. Entomol. Z. 54 (2007) 2, 157–167 / DOI 10.1002/mmnd.200700016
Herman, L.H. (2001). Catalog of the Staphylinidae (Insecta: Coleoptera).

External links
 

1831 births
1909 deaths
German entomologists
19th-century German zoologists